Gilles is a French masculine given name. It is derived from that of the medieval Saint Giles. 

People with the name Gilles include:
Gilles, Count of Montaigu (fl. 12th-century), French nobleman
Saint-Gilles (ca. 650–ca. 710), Greek Christian hermit
Gilles Aillaud (1928–2005), French painter, set decorator, and scenographer
Gilles Alé (or Hallet; 1620–1694), Flemish painter
Gilles Allou (1670–1751), French painter
Gilles Andriamahazo (1919–1989), Malagasy general and political figure
Gilles Andruet (1958–1995) French chess International Master 
Gilles Apap (born 1963), French classical violinist
Gilles Archambault (born 1933) Canadian novelist 
Gilles Archambault (1934–2009), Canadian gridiron footballer  
Gilles Aycelin de Montaigu (13??–13??), French cardinal, bishop, and diplomat
Gilles d'Ambra Azzopardi (born 1949), French psychosociologist
Gilles Dumas, French rugby league footballer and coach
Gilles Babinet (born 1967) French entrepreneur
Gilles Barbier, (born 1965), Vanuatu-born French artist
Gilles Baril (born 1940), Canadian politician 
Gilles Baril (born 1957), Canadian businessman, journalist, and politician
Gilles Beaudoin (1919–2007), Canadian politician 
Gilles-François de Beauvais (1693-ca. 1773), French Jesuit writer and preacher
Gilles Bellemare (1932–1980), Canadian politician
Gilles Bellemare (born 1952), composer, conductor, and music educator
Gilles Bensimon (born 1944), French fashion photographer 
Gilles Bernheim (born 1952), French rabbi
Gilles Bernier (born 1934), Canadian politician and diplomat 
Gilles Bernier (born 1955), Canadian politician
Gilles Berolatti (born 1944), French fencer
Gilles Bertould (born 1949), French track and field athlete 
Gilles Bettmer (born 1989), Luxembourgish footballer
Gilles Beyer (born 1957), French figure skater 
Gilles Binchois (ca. 1400–1460), Dutch composer
Gilles Bisson (born 1957), Canadian politician
Gilles Bilodeau (1955–2008), Canadian ice hockey player 
Gilles Binya (born 1984), Cameroonian footballer
Gilles Bouchard (born 1971), Canadian ice hockey coach
Gilles Bourdos (born 1963), French film director, screenwriter, and producer
Gilles Bourdouleix (born 1960), French politician 
Gilles Brassard (born 1955), Canadian cryptographer, computer scientist, and educator
Gilles Bruckner (born 1982), Luxembourgish racing driver
Gilles G. Brunet (1935–1984), Canadian military officer
Gilles-Joseph-Martin Bruneteau (1760–1830), French Revolutionary and Napoleonic general 
Gilles Canouet (born 1976), French road racing cyclist
Gilles Caouette (1940–2009), Canadian politician
Gilles Carle (1928–2009), Canadian director, screenwriter, and painter
Gilles Caron (1939–1970), French photographer and photojournalist
Gilles Carpentier (1950–2016), French writer and film editor
Gilles Carrez (born 1948), French politician
Gilles Caussade (born 1947), French film financier and producer
Gilles de Caux de Montlebert (ca. 1682–1733), French poet and playwright
Gilles Chabrier (born 19??), French astrophysicist
Gilles Chapadeau (born 19??), Canadian politician
Gilles Châtelet (1944–1999), French philosopher and mathematician
Gilles Chiasson (born 1966), American film producer, director, composer, writer, and actor
Gilles-Louis Chrétien (1754–1811), French musician
Gilles Cioni (born 1984), French footballer
Gilles Cistac (1961−2015), French-born Mozambican lawyer 
Gilles Colon (born 1981), Haitian-born Canadian gridiron football player
Gilles Constantinian (born 1964), French footballer 
Gilles de Corbeil (ca. 1140–11??) French royal physician, teacher, and poet 
Gilles Cormery (1950–1999), French poet and painter
Gilles Corrozet (1510–1568), French writer, printer, and bookseller
Gilles Coulier (born 1986), Belgian film director, scriptwriter, and producer
Gilles Courteau (born 1957), Canadian ice hockey executive 
Gilles Coustellier (born 1986), French mountain bike trials cyclist
Gilles Couturier (born 19??), Royal Canadian Navy officer 
Gilles Dambrine (born 19??), French engineer
Gilles Dauvé (born 1947), French political theorist, school teacher, communist, and translator
Gilles De Bilde (born 1971), Belgian footballer
Gilles De Haes (1597–1657), Flemish military General
Gilles Delion (born 1966), French road bicycle racer
Gilles Delouche (1948–2020), French classical literature scholar and orientalist 
Gilles Deleuze (1925–1995), French philosopher
Gilles Demarteau (1722–1776), Belgian-born French etcher, engraver, and publisher
Gilles De Oliveira (born 1984), French footballer
Gilles Domoraud (born 1979), Ivorian footballer
Gilles Doucende (born 1977), French footballer
Gilles Dumas (born 1962), French rugby league footballer and coach
Gilles Échevin (born 1948), Guadeloupean-born French track and field athlete 
Gilles Elseneer (born 1978), Belgian tennis player
Gilles Engeldinger (born 1984), Luxembourgish footballer
Gilles Epié (born 1958), French chef
Gilles Esnault (born 19??), French painter
Gilles Eyquem (born 1959), French footballer
Gilles Fabien (born 1978), French Guianan footballer
Gilles Fauconnier (born 1944), French linguist, cognitive science researcher, and author
Gilles Filleau des Billettes (1634–1720), French scholar, encyclopedist, and bibliographer
Gilles Floro (1964–1999), Guadeloupean singer
Gilles Fortin (born 1946), Canadian politician
Gilles Garcin (1647–1702), French painter
Gilles Gauthier (1935–2015), Canadian politician 
Gilles Gilbert (born 1949), Canadian ice hockey player
Gilles-Gaston Granger (1920–2016), French philosopher
Gilles Gobeil (born 1954), Canadian electroacoustic musician 
Gilles-Lambert Godecharle (1750−1835), Belgian sculptor
Gilles-William Goldnadel (born 1954), French-Israeli lawyer, author, and columnist
Gilles de Gouberville (1521−1578), French diarist
Gilles Goujon (born 1961), French chef and restaurateur 
Gilles de Gourmont (ca. 1499–1533), French bookseller and printer
Gilles Grangier (1911–1996), French film director and screenwriter
Gilles Gratton (born 1952), Canadian ice hockey player
Gilles Grégoire (1926–2006), Canadian politician, co-founder of the Parti Québécois 
Gilles Grelet (born 19??), French theorist and writer
Gilles Grimandi (born 1970), French footballer
Gilles Grondin (1943–2005), Canadian educator and politician 
Gilles Groulx (1931–1994), Canadian film director
Gilles Guérin (1611–1678), French sculptor
Gilles Guillain (born 1982), Colombian-born French actor
Gilles Guyot (born 1946), French management professor 
Gilles Hamel (born 1960), French ice hockey player
Gilles Hébert (born 19??), Canadian artist and museum director
Gilles Hilary (born 19??), French accountant academic
Gilles Hocquart (1694–1783), French Intendant of New France
Gilles Houde (1932–2014), Canadian politician
Gilles Jacquier (1968–2012), French photojournalist and reporter
Gilles Jalabert (born 1958), French wrestler 
Gilles Jaquet (born 1974), Swiss snowboarder
Gilles Joubert (1689–1775), French cabinet-maker
Gilles Joye (1424/1425–1483), Franco-Flemish Renaissance composer
Gilles Jullien (ca. 1651/1653–1703), French Baroque composer and organist
Gilles de Kerchove (born 1956), Belgian senior European Union official
Gilles Kahn (1946–2006), French computer scientist
Gilles Kepel (born 1955), French political scientist and Arabist
Gilles Klopman (1933–2015), Belgian-born American chemist
Gilles Kohler (born 1948), French actor
Gilles Labbé (born 1948), Canadian politician
Gilles Lalay (1962–1992) French enduro and rally raid racer
Gilles Lamontagne (1919–2016), Canadian politician
Gilles Lapouge (born 1923), French writer and journalist 
Gilles Latulippe (1937–2014), Canadian actor, comedian, theatre director, and manager
Gilles Larrain (born 1938), French-American photographer 
Gilles Lauzon, (1631–1687) French coppersmith of New France
Gilles Le Breton (died 1553), French Renaissance architect and master-mason 
Gilles Lebreton (born 1958), French politician
Gilles Legardinier (born 1965), French novelist
Gilles van Ledenberg (ca. 1550–1618), Dutch statesman
Gilles Leger (born 1941), Canadian ice hockey player
Gilles Le Guen (alias Abdel Jelil; born 1955), French self-styled Islamist and jihadist
Gilles Lehouillier (born 1953), Canadian politician civil servant
Gilles Lellouche (born 1972), French actor
Gilles Leroy (born 1958), French writer 
Gilles Létourneau (born 1945), Canadian attorney and judge
Gilles le Vinier (died 1252), French Medieval composer and musician
Gilles Li Muisis (ca. 1272–1352), French Medieval chronicler and poet 
Gilles Lipovetsky (born 1944), French philosopher, writer, sociologist, and educator
Gilles Loiselle (born 1929), Canadian politician
Gilles Lupien (1954–2021), Canadian sports agent and ice hockey player
Gilles de Maistre (born 1960), French screenwriter, film director, producer, journalist, and actor
Gilles Marceau (1928–2008), Canadian politician 
Gilles Marchal (1944–2013), French singer-songwriter
Gilles Marchand (born 1963), French film director and screenwriter
Gilles Marchildon (born 1965), Canadian francophone activist and LGBT activist
Gilles Marguet (born 1967), French biathlete
Gilles Marini (born 1976), French-born American actor
Gilles Marotte (1945–2005), Canadian ice hockey player
Gilles Mayer (1929–2015), Canadian ice hockey player
Gilles Mbang Ondo (born 1985), Gabonese footballer
Gilles Meloche (born 1950), Canadian ice hockey player, coach, and scout
Gilles Ménage (1613–1692), French scholar, philologist, lawyer, and writer
Gilles Mimouni (born 1956), French film director
Gilles Montezin (born 19??), French clothing designer 
Gilles Moreau (born 1945), French swimmer
Gilles Moretton (born 1958), French tennis player 
Gilles Morin (born 1931), Canadian politician 
Gilles Motet (born 1956), French computer scientist and software engineer
Gilles Müller (born 1983), Luxembourgish tennis player
Gilles Mureau (ca. 1450–1512), French Renaissance composer and singer
Gilles Ngomo (born 1987), Cameroonian footballer
Gilles de Noailles (1524–1600), French diplomat
Gilles Ouimet (born 19??), Canadian politician
Gilles Pagnon (born 1984),  German rugby player
Gilles Palsky (born 1962), French geographer and educator
Gilles Panizzi (born 1965), French rally driver 
Gilles Paquet (1936–2019), Canadian economist  
Gilles Paquet-Brenner (born 1974), French director and screenwriter 
Gilles Pargneaux (born 1957), French politician
Gilles de Paris (ca. 1160–1223/1224), French Medieval poet
Gilles Pélisson (born 1957), French business executive
Gilles Pelletier (1925–2018), Canadian actor
Gilles Perrault (born 1931), French writer and journalist
Gilles Peress (born 1946), French photographer
Gilles Perron (born 1940), Canadian politician 
Gilles Peterson (born 1964), French disc jockey and record label owner 
Gilles Peycelon (born 1960), French footballer
Gilles Pisier (born 1950), French mathematician 
Gilles Poisson (born 19??), Canadian wrestler 
Gilles Poitras (born 19??), Canadian anime and manga author 
Gilles Porte (born 1965), French film director, screenwriter, and cinematographer
Gilles Potvin (1923–2000),  Canadian music critic and music historian
Gilles Pouliot (born 1942), Canadian politician
Gilles Poux (born 1957), French politician
Gilles Pudlowski (born 1950), French journalist, writer, literary and gastronomic critic
Gilles Quénéhervé (born 1966), French sprinter 
Gilles Quispel (1916–2006), Dutch theologian and historian of Christianity and Gnosticism 
Gilles de Rais (ca. 1405–1440), French nobleman, knight, and serial killer of children
Gilles Rampillon (born 1953), French footballer
Gilles Reingot (ca. 1501–1530), Franco-Flemish Renaissance composer
Gilles Robert (born 1955), Canadian politician
Gilles de Roberval (1602–1675), French mathematician
Gilles de Robien (born 1941), French politician
Gilles Roch (born 1952), Canadian politician 
Gilles Rocheleau (1935–1998), Canadian politician
Gilles Rondy (born 1981), French swimmer 
Gilles Rousselet (1610–1686), French engraver
Gilles Rousset (born 1963), French footballer
Gilles Roussi (born 1947), French sculptor
Gilles Roux (born 1971), French speedcuber
Gilles de Roye (died 1478), Flemish chronicler
Gilles Ruyssen (born 1994), Belgian footballer
Gilles Ste-Croix (born 19??), Canadian entrepreneur and vice president and co-creator of Cirque du Soleil 
Gilles Saint-Paul (born 1963), French economist
Gilles Salles (born 19??), French oncologist and cancer researcher
Gilles Samoun (born 19??), French entrepreneur
Gilles Sanders (born 1964), French racing cyclist 
Gilles Savary (born 1954), French politician
Gilles Schey (ca. 1644–1703), Dutch Navy Admiral
Gilles Schnepp (born 1958), French business executive
Gilles Ségal (1929–2014), French actor, mime, and playwright
Gilles-Éric Séralini (born 1960), French molecular biologist, political advisor, and anti-GMO activist
Gilles Servat (born 1945), French singer-songwriter
Gilles Simeoni (born 1967), Corsican politician
Gilles Simon (born 1958), French Formula One racing driver
Gilles Simon (born 1984), French tennis player 
Gilles de Souvré (ca. 1540–1626), French nobleman and military officer
Gilles Sunu (born 1991), French footballer
Gilles Taillon (born 1945), Canadian politician
Gilles Talmant (born 1970), French racing cyclist
Gilles Terral (1943–1998), French entomologist
Gilles Tetreault (born 19??), Canadian attempted murder victim
Gilles Thibaudeau (born 1963), Canadian ice hockey player
Gilles Thomas (1929–1985), French science fiction writer
Gilles Tonelli (born 1957), Monegasque engineer, diplomat and politician
Gilles de Toucy (died ca. 1139–1142), French Medieval Cardinal-Bishop 
Georges Gilles de la Tourette (1857–1904), French physician and namesake of Tourette's syndrome
Gilles Tran (born 19??), French 3D artist
Gilles Tréhin (born 1972), French artist and author
Gilles Tremblay (1932–2017), Canadian composer
Gilles Tremblay (1938–2014), Canadian ice hockey player 
Gilles Turcot (1917–2010), Canadian Armed Forces General
Gilles Vaillancourt (born 1941), former Canadian politician
Gilles Valiquette (born 1952), Canadian rock musician
Gilles Van Assche (born 19??), Belgian cryptographer
Gilles Veissière (born 1959), French football referee 
Gilles Verdez (born 1964), French sports journalist, television and radio columnist
Gilles Verlant (1957–2013), Belgian journalist and music critic 
Gilles Vidal (born ca. 1972), French automobile designer
Gilles Vigne (born 1950), French swimmer
Gilles Vigneault (born 1928), Canadian poet, publisher, and singer-songwriter
Gilles Villemure (born 1940), Canadian ice hockey player
Gilles Villeneuve (1950–1982), Canadian racing driver
Gilles Vincent (born 1958), French crime fiction author
Gilles Yapi Yapo (born 1982), Ivorian footballer 
Gilles Zolty (born 19??), Canadian musician, singer-songwriter, and music producer

Fictional people
Gilles, a stock character of French farce and Commedia dell'Arte

References

French masculine given names